Savvatiya is a rural locality (a settlement) in Cheryomushskoye Rural Settlement of Kotlassky District, Arkhangelsk Oblast, Russia. The population was 1,740 as of 2010. There are 14 streets.

Geography 
Savvatiya is located 38 km south of Kotlas (the district's administrative centre) by road. Berezovy is the nearest rural locality.

References 

Rural localities in Kotlassky District